Sant Singh Virmani is a US-based Indian plant breeder, rice scientist and a former Principal Scientist at the International Rice Research Institute (IRRI). He served IRRI from 1979 to 2005 and retired from its service as the deputy head of the Plant Breeding, Genetics and Biochemistry Division.

Virmani is an elected Fellow of the American Association for the Advancement of Science (AAAS) and a recipient of the International Service in Crop Science Award from the Crop Science Society of America (CSSA). He received the TWAS Prize in 2000 followed by the Pravasi Bharatiya Samman of the Ministry of Overseas Indian Affairs, Government of India in 2003. The Government of India honoured him again with the fourth highest civilian honour of the Padma Shri, in 2008, for his contributions to agricultural science. A few months later, Netlink Foundation honoured him for his service to humanity in combating hunger and poverty around the world with a plaque.

See also 
 International Rice Research Institute

References

External links 
 

Recipients of the Padma Shri in science & engineering
Living people
Year of birth missing (living people)
Indian agriculturalists
Plant breeding
TWAS fellows
Fellows of the American Association for the Advancement of Science
Place of birth missing (living people)
Recipients of Pravasi Bharatiya Samman